Hakea mitchellii, commonly known as  desert hakea, is a shrub species in the family Proteaceae.

Description
Profuse showy white or cream flowers appear in racemes in the leaf axils between October and January in the species' native range.

Taxonomy and naming
The species was first formally described in 1856 by Swiss botanist Carl Meissner and the description was published  in Prodromus Systematis Naturalis Regni Vegetabilis. The type specimen was collected near Pyramid Hill during Thomas Livingston Mitchell's 1836 expedition.  Hakea mitchellii was named after  Mitchell to honour the collector of the species.

Distribution and habitat
Desert hakea grows in mallee-heath vegetation on calcareous sandy soil.  Mainly a South Australian species occurring on Eyre, Yorke and Fleurieu Peninsulas, Kangaroo Island and south of the Murray River to Naracoorte, extending into  western Victoria.

References

mitchellii
Flora of South Australia
Flora of Victoria (Australia)
Proteales of Australia
Plants described in 1846
Taxa named by Carl Meissner